Alessandra Galloni (born c. 1974) is an Italian journalist. She was named editor in chief of Reuters in 2021. She won an Overseas Press Club Award, and Business Journalist of the Year Award.

Career 
She graduated from Harvard University, and the London School of Economics. She was a reporter for Reuters's Italian-language bureau. From 2000 to 2013, she was a reporter at The Wall Street Journal. From 2013 to 2015, she was editor of the Reuters Southern Europe bureau. From 2015 to 2021, she was Reuters global managing editor.

Works 
 Pope Francis: From the End of the Earth to Rome, 2013

References

External links 
 Dove va l’informazione? Intervista ad Alessandra Galloni di Reuters primaonline.it, 28 March 2021

Italian women journalists
Alumni of the London School of Economics
Harvard University alumni
1970s births
Living people
Year of birth uncertain
Minard Editor Award winners